was a Japanese general of the Nara period and of the early Heian period. He was the first to hold the title of sei-i taishōgun. The title of Shōgun was bestowed by Emperor Kanmu in 794. Some believe he was born in 727. His father was Ōtomo no Koshibi.

Chronology
He was born of Ōtomo no Koshibi .
He was granted the second grade of the fifth rank of honor in 799 and appointed the lieutenant (suke) of the Palace Guards in 780.
In 783 he was made the deputy general in the Hitachi expedition.
In 791 he was granted the second grade of the fourth rank of honor.
In 794 he was declared Sei-i Taishōgun ("Barbarian-subduing Great General") by Emperor Kanmu, and together with Sakanoue no Tamuramaro subdued the Emishi.
In 795 he was granted the second grade of the third rank of honor and the Order of Merit, Second Class, for his military achievements.
He died on July 14, 809.

References

731 births
809 deaths
8th-century Japanese people
9th-century Japanese people
8th-century shōguns
Shōguns
Place of birth unknown
Place of death missing
Date of birth unknown